Pireh Yusefian may refer to:
 Pireh Yusefian-e Olya
 Pireh Yusefian-e Sofla